Blandford (1919–1935) was an Irish-bred Thoroughbred racehorse best known as the three-time Leading sire in Great Britain & Ireland who sired eleven British Classic Race winners including four which won The Derby. He was the Leading sire in France and also in England in the same year.

He was bred by the Irish National Stud at Tully. Blandford had pneumonia as a foal and was not ready for the early sale, but was later offered at the December Newmarket Sale where he sold for 720 guineas ro Messrs. RC & SC Dawson.

Race record
Trained by co-owner Dick Dawson, Blandford raced only four times in his career. At age two he ran second in the Windsor Castle Stakes at Ascot Racecourse and at three won the Princess of Wales's Stakes. Bad forelegs, inherited from his grandsire, John O'Gaunt, limited Blandford's career to four starts.

Stud record
When he was retired to stud he initially stood at a fee of £149 which was later raised to 400 guineas. During 1924 his progeny earned £70,510.

According to Thoroughbred Heritage, at stud Blandford proved to be one of the great sires of the English turf. Among his offspring were: 

Blandford was still successfully breeding at Whatcombe Stables in Wantage, Oxfordshire when he died unexpectedly on 24 April 1935 at age sixteen. He is buried in Whatcombe's equine cemetery. Blandford sired the winners of 308 races worth £327,840 in England, plus overseas winners.

Pedigree

See also
 List of leading Thoroughbred racehorses

References

External links
 Blandford at Thoroughbred Heritage

1919 racehorse births
1935 racehorse deaths
Racehorses bred in Ireland
Racehorses trained in the United Kingdom
British Champion Thoroughbred Sires
Thoroughbred family 3-o
Chefs-de-Race